Against Nature is an American metal band from Baltimore, Maryland.

Biography
Against Nature was formed in July 2004 when, after a 13-year hiatus, members of the band Revelation's original line-up from their debut album, Salvation's Answer (1991), began rehearsing and writing new music. They took their name from a Revelation song from their second album, Never Comes Silence (1993). The band is releasing their albums via a DIY label Bland Hand Records as limited-edition CDs, but all of their albums are available for free download on the band's official site.

Against Nature has played the Templars of Doom II festival in Indianapolis, the Doom Shall Rise IV festival in Germany, the Stoner Hands of Doom VII festival in Mesa, AZ, the Doomed to Fall festival in San Antonio, TX in 2006, and the Doom or Be Doomed festival (hosted and organized by John Brenner and Josh Hart) in Baltimore, MD in 2007.

Band members
 John Brenner - vocals, guitar
 Bert Hall - bass
 Steve Branagan - drums

Discography
Appease CD (2005 Bland Hand)
Panoply CD (2005 Bland Hand)
Pluperfect 7" (2006 The Church Within)
Safe Dissonance CD (2006 Bland Hand)
Ghosting CD (2006 Bland Hand)
Leer CD (2006 Bland Hand)
The Anxiety of Influence CD (2007 Bland Hand)
Unfolded CD (2007 Bland Hand)
Descend/Much in Little CD (2008 Bland Hand)

External links
 Official Site 
 Official Myspace 
 Bland Hand Records 

American doom metal musical groups
Heavy metal musical groups from Maryland
Musical groups from Baltimore
Musical groups established in 2004
American musical trios